Hans Meiger of Werde, Hans Hammer of Hans Hammerer (born between 1440 and 1445; died summer 1519) was a German stonemason, architect and builder of the late Gothic period, most notable for his design and construction of the pulpits at Strasbourg Cathedral and Notre-Dame-de-la-Nativité in Saverne.

References

Medieval German sculptors

16th-century German architects

Stonemasons
Stone carvers
1440s births
1519 deaths
Year of birth uncertain